The 2020 Inter-Provincial Cup was the eighth edition of the Inter-Provincial Cup, a List A cricket competition that was played in Ireland during September 2020. It was the fourth edition of the competition to be played with List A status. Leinster Lightning were the defending champions.

The first two scheduled matches of the tournament, both between North West Warriors and Northern Knights, were abandoned without a ball being bowled due to the weather. The next match saw Leinster Lightning beat Northern Knights by 91 runs, giving them a bonus point to lead the competition at the mid-way point. In the fourth fixture, Leinster Lightning beat North West Warriors by 62 runs, in a rain-affected match. The win, which included a bonus point, was enough to give Leinster an unassailable lead in the tournament, and their seventh consecutive title. Leinster Lightning went on to win their remaining two matches, finishing the tournament undefeated.

Background
The tournament was originally scheduled to take place from 8 May to 29 July 2020. However, on 26 March 2020, Cricket Ireland confirmed that domestic competitions would be pushed back to 28 May 2020 at the earliest, due to the COVID-19 pandemic. Government restrictions prevented any cricket, including training, from starting before June 2020. The Irish government announced a provisional date of 20 July 2020 for a possible restart of sporting fixtures in the country. Plans of a possible start of domestic cricket in Ireland, with matches taking place during August and September, were looked at in July 2020. On 22 July 2020, Cricket Ireland confirmed the revised fixtures for the tournament. On 15 August 2020, all the teams confirmed their squads for the tournament.

Points table

Fixtures

References

External links
 Series home at ESPN Cricinfo

Interprovincial Cup
Inter-Provincial Cup seasons